iPad is a line of tablet computers by Apple Inc.

iPad may also refer to:
iPad models:
iPad (1st generation)
iPad 2, successor to the iPad
iPad (3rd generation), successor to the iPad 2, often called the iPad 3 or the New iPad
iPad (4th generation), successor to the 3rd-generation iPad, often called the iPad 4 or the iPad with Retina Display
iPad Air, successor to the 4th-generation iPad
iPad Air 2, successor to the iPad Air
iPad Air (2019) or 3rd generation, successor to the iPad Air 2
iPad Air (2020) or 4th generation, successor to the 2019 model
iPad Air (5th generation), successor to the 2020 model
iPad (2017), successor to the iPad Air 2 marketed as iPad
iPad (2018), successor to the 2017 model
iPad (2019), successor to the 2018 model
iPad (2020), successor to the 2019 model
iPad (2021), successor to the 2020 model
iPad Mini, various smaller versions of the tablet computer
iPad Mini (1st generation)
iPad Mini 2, successor to the iPad Mini
iPad Mini 3, successor to the iPad Mini 2
iPad Mini 4, successor to the iPad Mini 3
iPad Mini (5th generation), successor to the iPad Mini 4
iPad Mini (6th generation), successor to the 5th-generation iPad Mini
iPad Pro, various larger versions of the tablet computer
iPad Pro (1st generation)
iPad Pro (2nd generation), successor to the 1st-generation iPad Pro
iPad Pro (3rd generation), successor to the 2nd-generation iPad Pro
iPad Pro (4th generation), successor to the 3rd-generation iPad Pro
iPad Pro (5th generation), successor to the 4th-generation iPad Pro

Fujitsu iPAD, retail point-of-sale device
Proview iPAD, a computer manufactured by the company who sold the iPad trademark to Apple
"iPad" (song), a 2022 song by the Chainsmokers

See also
iPod
eyepad